Myers Flat is a rural locality in the City of Greater Bendigo in the Australian state of Victoria. Myers Flat was named after Thomas Myers who was the co-proprietor of the Weddikar pastoral run.

History
European settlement began in Myers Flat in 1845, then known as "Myers Creek". Gold was first discovered in Myers Flat in 1852. In 1864 St Augustine's Catholic church was built.

References 

Bendigo
Towns in Victoria (Australia)
Suburbs of Bendigo